The Old Friends Quartet was a vocal group that sang Southern gospel music. They released all their albums with Spring House Productions. In 2002, their DVD Encore, filmed in Mobile, Alabama, won a Southern Gospel Music Association Award.

Members (past and present)

Line-ups

Discography
Encore - 2001
Feelin' Fine - 2003

References

American Christian musical groups
Gospel quartets
Southern gospel performers